The Regulate Cannabis Like Alcohol initiative is a ballot initiative for legalization of cannabis in the U.S. state of Ohio. It was introduced in 2021, originally for the 2022 general ballot, then moved potentially to 2023 following a lawsuit.

History
State law in Ohio allows citizens to bring initiatives before the state legislature. With enough signatures, a group can force the legislature to consider an initiative, and with more signatures can send it to voters on the November ballot. In Ohio, a group called the Coalition to Regulate Marijuana Like Alcohol brought the initiative to the Ohio Secretary of State to be a 2022 ballot initiative. It was approved on August 30, 2021, for signature gathering. Over 200,000 signatures were submitted to the state at the end of 2021.

A lawsuit over filing deadlines resulted in the Ohio Secretary of State and the state legislature agreeing the initiative's signatures collected in 2021 and 2022 may be applied toward a 2023 ballot deadline.

Provisions
Adults age 21 and up may purchase, possess and consume marijuana. Home grow of up to six plants per person or 12 plants per residence is allowed. The Division of Cannabis Control is established within the Ohio Department of Commerce to regulate commerce. Cannabis testing laboratories and supply chain are to be regulated.

The initiative also specifies how tax revenues under the new law would be spent. Thirty-six percent (36%) would be designated for "social equity and jobs" programs, estimated to be as high as $150 million per year. Thirty-six percent (36%) would go to communities that have dispensaries. Twenty-five percent (25%) would go to education and addiction treatment programs, and 3% would be used for regulatory and administrative costs.

Sponsor
The sponsor of the initiative, Campaign to Regulate Marijuana Like Alcohol, is an affiliate of Marijuana Policy Project.

Politics 
Ohio passed medical cannabis (along with decriminalized cannabis) in 2016 under Ohio House Bill 523. As of 2022, recreational cannabis is still not legal in the state.

In early 2022, pro-cannabis advocates gathered signatures to send recreational legalization measure to the state legislature. In April, the Senate president publicly announced that he would not bring the measure up for a vote. Under Ohio law, advocates now have a second opportunity to gather more signatures, and if they gather enough, the measure will go on the ballot in November. “The recreational cannabis petition collected 136,000 verified signatures, enough to get considered by the General Assembly, but would require an additional 132,877 signatures to proceed to the ballot.”

The largest organized opposition comes from the Center for Christian Virtue, which believes legalized cannabis will produce negative impacts on neighborhoods and society’s drug addiction problems. The main proponent behind the ballot initiative is the Coalition to Regulate Marijuana Like Alcohol (CRMLA), which dismissed the Center for Christian Virtue’s opposition as “Prohibition-style talking points from 20 years ago.”

See also
Cannabis in Ohio
List of 2021 United States cannabis reform proposals
List of 2022 United States cannabis reform proposals

References

External links

2021 cannabis law reform
Proposed laws of the United States
Cannabis in Ohio